JEUS (an abbreviation of Java Enterprise User Solution) is a Korean Web application server which is developed by TmaxSoft. JEUS provides the web application server component of TmaxSoft's middleware-tier framework solution. It has been widely adopted in Korea where it holds the largest (42.1%) share of the market.

TmaxSoft released JEUS 1.0 in 2000. In 2001, it received J2EE 1.2 certification for JEUS 3.0., In 2013, it received the world’s first Java EE 7 certification for JEUS 8.

History 
JEUS was launched in April 2000. The following table shows a list of versions and release dates:

Features 
JEUS 7 provides the following features:
 Cloud Architecture Support
Domain Architecture: (JEUS 7) supports a massive scale computing environment with lightweight and speedy distributed clustering.

Dynamic Clustering: A core function that enables rapid elasticity which allows the administrator to easily add and delete idle resources as needed.

Graceful Redeployment: When application redeployment is needed during operation, a continuous service environment is provided by guaranteeing the completion of processing of session requests prior to redeployment.

 Consolidated Caching
Superior performance is provided for large-scale requests, by the improved caching function.
Memory is managed efficiently by the use of an optimized LRU Processing Algorithm that improves performance.

 Stable Large Capacity Transaction Processing
When connected to the WebtoB server, stable large-scale transaction processing ability is exhibited, due to Multiplexing I/O, Request Queuing, Dynamic Load Balancing, and Stream Pipe Communication

 Hot Swap
By reloading only the modified class instead of the entire class, when a function is modified, development productivity is dramatically improved.

WebtoB 
WebtoB is the web server component that complements JEUS as TmaxSoft's middleware-tier solution. WebtoB uses a multi-thread architecture, which allows it to address multiple requests through a single process. Other features include disk and memory caching, load balancing, clustering, dynamic queuing and the ability to add additional nodes without interrupting operations, all of which help improve the server's speed and stability. WebtoB uses secure sockets layer and operates without open firewall ports, which inherently provides for stronger data security. Administrators can also configure access control lists.

Java EE Certification 
 JEUS 3.0 : J2EE 1.2 certified, 2002
 JEUS 4.0 : J2EE 1.3 certified, 2004
 JEUS 5.0 : J2EE 1.4 certified, 2005
 JEUS 6.0 : Java EE 5 certified, 2007
 JEUS 7.0 : Java EE 6 certified, 2012
 JEUS 8.0 : Java EE 7 certified
 JEUS 8.5 : JaKarta EE 8 certified

Minimum Installation Requirements 
The following shows the minimum installation requirements for JEUS

Windows 2000, 2003, XP, Vista
 500MB or more of Hard Disk Space
 128MB RAM

Solaris, HP-UX, AIX, Linux
 500MB or more of Hard Disk space

Edition 
There are two editions of JEUS available:
 Standard Edition
 Enterprise Edition

Specifications support by version

Competitor Products 

 WebLogic : produced by Oracle. United States
 WebSphere: produced by IBM. United States

See also

 Web server
 Web application server
 TmaxSoft

References 

Java enterprise platform
Service-oriented architecture-related products
Web server software